Eva Serrano (born 22 April 1978 in Nîmes) is a French former individual rhythmic gymnast. She was the 1999 European All-around bronze medalist and is France's most decorated and successful rhythmic gymnast. She is also a 6-time French National All-around champion.

Career 
Serrano's international career spanned eight years and competed in two Olympic cycles. She started rhythmic gymnastics at age seven.

She made her career breakthrough in 1997, winning France's first European Championship medals (bronze with rope and ribbon), she repeated her success winning two bronze medals (hoop, ribbon) at the 1997 World Championships. She won the All-around bronze medal at the 1999 European Championships.

She ranked 19th, 7th, 9th, 7th, 4th in All-around finals at the 1993, 1994, 1995, 1997, 1999 World Championships.

At the 1996 Summer Olympics in Atlanta, she placed 7th in qualifications, 8th in the semi-final round and placed 6th in the finals. She went to compete in her second Olympics in 2000 Sydney she placed 4th in qualifications and finished 5th in the finals, the highest placement for a non-Eastern European gymnast since Carolina Pascual, Carmen Acedo and Maisa Lloret.

Serrano's final competition was the Zenith Tournament in Paris in December 2000, where she won three gold medals. The Zenith event also served as a tribute as she announced her retirement.

She was elected to sit as president on the FIG Athletes' Commission for rhythmic gymnastics. She now has a son named Oihan.

References

External links
 
 
 
 
 

1978 births
Living people
French rhythmic gymnasts
Olympic gymnasts of France
Gymnasts at the 2000 Summer Olympics
Medalists at the Rhythmic Gymnastics World Championships
Sportspeople from Nîmes
Universiade medalists in gymnastics
Universiade gold medalists for France
Universiade bronze medalists for France
Medalists at the 1997 Summer Universiade